John Shaw Crout (July 5, 1899 - October 31, 1987) was the Director of Engineering at Battelle Memorial Institute when, in 1944, Battelle was visited by Chester Carlson, in order to obtain support for his idea about a xerographic process.

One of Crout's colleagues (Dr Russell W. Dayton) arranged for Carlson to give a demonstration to Crout. Crout was "intrigued by the opportunity to apply Battelle's expertise in physics", so sought the advice of Dr Roland M. Schaeffert, the head of the institute's newly created graphics division. Following a promising report from Schaeffert, Crout told Carlson that the institute would negotiate terms.

See also 
 Xerox

References 

20th-century American engineers
1899 births
1987 deaths